Daniil Ivanov (born September 23, 1986 in Russia) is an international motorcycle speedway and ice speedway rider.

Speedway career
Ivanov is a four time World Champion winning the gold medal at the Individual Ice Speedway World Championship in the 2013 Individual Ice Racing World Championship, 2014 Individual Ice Racing World Championship, 2019 Individual Ice Racing World Championship and 2020 Individual Ice Racing World Championship.

Ivanov is also a nine time world champion having won the Ice Speedway of Nations on nine occasions. He has also represented Russia in the 2007 Speedway World Cup.

In 2022, Ivanov was unable to take part in any competition following the Fédération Internationale de Motocyclisme ban on Russian and Belarusian motorcycle riders, teams, officials, and competitions as a result of the 2022 Russian invasion of Ukraine.

Honours 
Ice Individual World Champion: 2013, 2014, 2019, 2020
Ice Team World Champion: 2009, 2011, 2012, 2013, 2014, 2015, 2018, 2019, 2020
European Pairs Championship finalist: 2006
Russian Individual Speedway Championship: 2009 & 2011 silver medal, 2006 bronze medal
Individual U-21 World Championship finalist: 2007 
Team U-21 World Championship semi-finalist: 2005, 2006
Individual Junior Russian Championship: 2003 bronze medal, 2004 silver medal, 2006 silver medal

See also 
Russia national speedway team

References

1986 births
Living people
Russian speedway riders
Ice Speedway World Champions
People from Kamensk-Uralsky
Sportspeople from Sverdlovsk Oblast